Harold Daniel Donohue (June 18, 1901 – November 4, 1984) was an American politician. He represented the third district and fourth district of Massachusetts in the United States House of Representatives from 1947 to 1974.

Donohue was born in Worcester, Massachusetts June 18, 1901 graduated from St. John's High School in 1920 and from Northeastern University School of Law in 1925.  He was a lawyer, councilman and alderman from the city of his birth 1927–1935.  Donohue served in the United States Navy, 1942–1945.  He was elected as a Democrat to the Eightieth Congress and to the thirteen succeeding Congresses (January 3, 1947 - December 31, 1974). During his final congressional term, Donohue was the second ranking Democrat on the Judiciary Committee, which considered articles of impeachment against President Richard M. Nixon for his role in covering up the Watergate scandal.

He was not a candidate for reelection to the Ninety-fourth Congress in 1974.  He died on November 4, 1984, in Worcester, and was interred in St. John's Cemetery in that city.

In 1987, the Harold D. Donohue Federal Building and United States Courthouse was renamed for him.

External links

 Retrieved on 2009-05-20

1901 births
1984 deaths
Worcester, Massachusetts City Council members
Northeastern University School of Law alumni
Massachusetts lawyers
United States Navy personnel of World War II
Democratic Party members of the United States House of Representatives from Massachusetts
20th-century American lawyers
20th-century American politicians